Qowzlu (also Romanized as Qowzlū) is a village in Eypak Rural District in the Central District of Eshtehard County, Iran. At the 2006 census, its population was 65, in 14 families.

References 

Populated places in Eshtehard County